Kyle Sokol (born October 31, 1974) is an American bassist and skateboarder. He has played in bands such as Disareyen, Mercy McCoy, Trace of Day, Sectioned, Rude Squad, King of Denmark, Noble Jones, Philistines, Leadfoot, and Hell on Earth.

He contributed to the long running Rivot Rag Tampa Bay metal music magazine/publication with a bass guitar column entitled "The Low End" for several years. He is one of the few bass players in metal that uses extensively the slap & pop playing technique, along with two-handed tapping. He was chosen by Kelly Shaefer of the Band Atheist to play while Kelly was in Neurotica and about to tour on Ozzfest.

The reunion of Atheist never came to fruition for a myriad of reasons at that time. Sokol currently tours the South East with several bands. He teaches lessons privately and works as a session player in the Tampa, Florida area. He has worked with, played with, and or recorded with artists such as Victor Wooten, Steve Bailey, Chuck Rainey, Peter Frampton, Edgar Meyer, Stu Hamm, Howard Levy, Joseph Wooten, Future Man, Richard Bona, JD Blair, Anthony Jackson, 311, Matisyahu, Rancid, Pietasters, Framing Hanley, Everclear, and 10 Years to name a few. He has served as a part-time staff member with Victor Wooten at his Wooten Bass/Nature Camp in Nashville, Tennessee.

Sokol is also known for his sponsored and professional skateboarding career. He started skating in about 1983, and grew up skating with such other local Florida pros as Rodney Mullen and Mike McGill. In 2001, he had an "oldschool style" pro model on Blitz Skateboards, which the company later changed the name to Subvert Skateboards due to legal issues with the prior name.

Currently, he skateboards for Them Skateboards based out of Saint Petersburg, Florida and also rides for Webb Trucks. Sokol is commonly known as "Old School Kyle" or "OSK". He also developed and founded the Florida Skate Museum, which captures the history of Florida skateboarding and decks from Florida riders.

Articles
 Creative Loafing: Rude Squad rock a full house with VooDoo Glow Skulls from 
 Rude Squad at the Free for All from Tampa Bay Online
 Great Music You've Never Heard from The St. Pete Crew
 Floridian: In Your Own Backyard from The St. Pete Times
 Coping Block Issue 42: Florida Skate Museum interview from Coping Block

References
 Kyle Sokol Artist Homepage  September 26, 2017
 Warwick Artist Profile for Kyle Sokol  November 27, 2012
 Warwick Streamer LX Custom Kyle Sokol Model "Kyle Sokol Custom Model" October 30, 2012.
 Official Press Release for Rude Squad Record Deal Signing "Official Press Release Rude Squad Signs Record Contract" March 10, 2010.
 M Basses Homepage "M Basses Homepage" December 3, 2008.
 Wooten, Victor "Bass Nature Camp" November 6, 2006. Accessed November 6, 2006.
 SkateAmerica "Skate America's Pro Skateboarders" January 12, 2007. Accessed January 12, 2007.
 360 Skate "360Skate.com PRS Pro Team" March 22, 2007. Accessed March 22, 2007
 Floridaskater.com "FloridaSkater.com Volume 2, #4, November 2002, Olliewood Skate Jam - Hosted by Alan Gelfand" November 2002. Accessed November 2002.
 Murder Ride Skateboards Homepage "Murder Ride Skateboards Homepage" October 30, 2009.
 Personal Homepage "Kyle Sokol Homepage" February 3, 2010.

American punk rock bass guitarists
American heavy metal bass guitarists
American male bass guitarists
American skateboarders
Living people
1974 births
21st-century American bass guitarists
21st-century American male musicians